Ethan Tecumseh Vishniac (born 1955) is an American astrophysicist. He is the Editor-in-Chief of the Astrophysical Journal and a professor of Astronomy at Johns Hopkins University in Baltimore, after holding positions at University of Saskatchewan in Saskatoon,  McMaster University in Hamilton, Ontario, Canada,  and University of Texas in Austin.

Education
Vishniac graduated from University of Rochester and Harvard University. He received his Ph.D. in astrophysics in 1980 from Harvard University while working under the direction of William H. Press. After Harvard, Vishniac spent two years as a post doctoral fellow working under Jeremiah P. Ostriker at Princeton University.

Research
His best known scientific work is the study of instabilities in expanding blast waves.  In Vishniac (1983), he demonstrated that a blast wave expanding in a sufficiently compressible medium would be subject to a linear overstability growing as the square root of time.  This is usually known as the Vishniac instability, and generally occurs in any thin enough slab bounded by a shock on one side and a contact discontinuity to a higher temperature region on the other.  In Vishniac (1994) he then demonstrated that a thin-enough slab bounded by shocks on both sides is subject to a nonlinear instability, usually described as a nonlinear thin shell instability (NTSI).  
He has also worked with success in cosmology and the theory of astrophysical dynamos.

Honors and awards
 2001: Elected Fellow of the American Physical Society "for pioneering contributions to the study of blast-wave stability, the generation of secondary anisotropies in the microwave background, and the study of MHD turbulence and dynamos in astrophysical objects."

Personal life
He is the son of microbiologist Wolf V. Vishniac and grandson of photographer Roman Vishniac. His wife Ilene Busch-Vishniac, the ninth president of the University of Saskatchewan (2012-2014), was previously Dean of the Faculty of Engineering at Johns Hopkins, and provost and vice-president (academic) of McMaster University from 2007 until 2012.

References

General references
 Vishniac, E. T. 1983, Astrophys. J., 274, 152
 Vishniac, E. T. 1994, Astrophys. J., 428, 186

External links

A current list of refereed papers from NASA ADS

1955 births
Living people
American astronomers
Johns Hopkins University faculty
Academic staff of McMaster University
Academic staff of the University of Saskatchewan
University of Texas at Austin faculty
University of Rochester alumni
Harvard University alumni
Fellows of the American Physical Society
The Astrophysical Journal editors
The Astronomical Journal editors